This is a list of mosques in Saudi Arabia.

See also
 Islam in Saudi Arabia
 Lists of mosques

References

External links

 
Saudi Arabia
Mosques